Dorcadion ciscaucasicum is a species of longhorn beetle in the subfamily Lamiinae.

Description
The prothorax is without raised bristles. The outer dorsal stripe is nearly twice the suture, which is slightly narrower than the shoulder.

Distribution
The species is found in Russia and the Caucasus, and is also known to inhabit the steppes.

References

boluense
Beetles described in 1899